French Flat or French Camp now a ghost town was in Tuolumne County, California.  It was located near French Flat from which it took its name, one and a half miles south southwest of Tuttletown. Its location was near the flat, northwest of an 1,894 foot mountain.

History
The town was a company mining town during the 1860s with a population of about 1,000.

Today 
The site today is accessed by French Flat Road, off Rawhide Road, through private property.  There are remains of a water cistern, water tanks, foundations of a hotel and various buildings and remains of fences.

References

External links 
 Jamestown District, Mother Lode belt, Tuolumne Co., California, USA includes French Flat.

Former settlements in Tuolumne County, California
Tuolumne
History of Tuolumne County, California